Richard Angwin is a weather-presenter, currently working for Al Jazeera English.

Previously, he presented the weather on BBC Points West from 2000 to 2011. This is the regional local news programme for Bristol, Somerset, Wiltshire and Gloucestershire which is on BBC ONE weekdays at 1330, 1830 and 2225. Also as a latest series in 2007 "Ask Angwin" featured on Points West answering weather questions.

Biography

Richard's interest in the weather began during geography lessons at grammar school. After A Levels he joined the Met Office as a weather observer in 1979 and spent the first 10 years of his career at RAF Lyneham, Exeter International Airport and RAF Honington. During this time Richard gained further A Levels and an HNC in Maths and Physics. This allowed him to gain a place on a forecasting course in 1990 and he then spent the next 10 years of his career as a forecaster based at Bristol Weather Centre.

When the centre closed in 2000, Richard became permanently based at the BBC in Bristol. He began his broadcasting career in 1994 and in addition to three daily television forecasts on BBC Points West, he also provided radio broadcasts for the BBC's local radio stations and websites in the West.

On 27 May 2011 Richard Angwin left the BBC after 11 years on Points West, moving to the Al Jazeera English news channel.

Personal life

Richard is a keen skier and enjoys travelling, having toured Africa, S.E. Asia, South America and the United States in recent years. He has also completed a degree in Environmental Sciences with the Open University.

Before moving to Al Jazeera English much of his spare time was taken up with walking the Mendip Hills with his Dalmatian, Poppy, although he could occasionally be found pounding the roads, training for the Bristol Half Marathon or his skiing trips.

References

External links
Personal Site

BBC weather forecasters
Living people
British people of Cornish descent
Year of birth missing (living people)